The British Mass Spectrometry Society is a registered charity founded in 1964 that encourages participation in every aspect of mass spectrometry.  It aims to encourage participation in all aspects of mass spectrometry on the widest basis, to promote knowledge and advancement in the field and to provide a forum for the exchange of views and information. It is committed to ensuring equal opportunities and reflecting the diversity of the society as a whole. The first foundations of the BMSS were laid in 1949 with the establishment of the Mass Spectrometry Panel by the Hydrocarbon Research Group.

Conferences
The society's annual meeting is held in the first week of September as well as regular special interest group meetings (Lipidomics, MALDI & Imaging, Ambient Ionisation, Environmental & Food Analysis) through the year, in locations throughout the United Kingdom. Locations of the society's annual meetings beginning in 1965:

Grants
In 1985, the Society used the proceeds from the 10th International Mass Spectrometry Conference to establish 7 Beynon PhD Studentships. In 2007, the Society announced they would initiate summer studentship projects and in 2012 they announced BMSS research grants.

Publications 

 Mass Matters

Presidents 

 John Monaghan 2003 -

Past Chairs

Awards
In 1987 the society announce the establishment of the Aston Medal to be awarded to “individuals deserving special recognition by reason of their outstanding contributions to knowledge in the biological, chemical, engineering, mathematical, medical, or physical sciences relating directly to mass spectrometry”.  In 2002 the BMSS Medal was established by the society “to recognise sustained contributions by individual members of the British Mass Spectrometry Society to the development of mass spectrometry, primarily within the UK.”

BMSS Medal
Recipients of the BMSS medal are:

 Professor Edward Houghton
 Professor Anthony Mallet
 Professor John J Monaghan
 Professor Frank S Pullen
 Professor Gareth Brenton
 Professor Alison Ashcroft
 Professor John G Langley

Barber Prize

Bordoli Prize

References 

1964 establishments in the United Kingdom
Chemistry education
Chemical industry in the United Kingdom
Learned societies of the United Kingdom
Mass spectrometry
Science and technology in the United Kingdom
Scientific organizations established in 1964